

Wolfgang Erdmann (13 November 1898 – 5 September 1946) was a German general during World War II. He was  a recipient of the Knight's Cross of the Iron Cross of Nazi Germany.

Awards and decorations

 Clasp to the Iron Cross (1939) 2nd Class (16 September 1939) & 1st Class (14 June 1940)
 War Merit Cross with Swords 2nd Class (30 January 1943)
 Knight's Cross of the Iron Cross on 8 February 1945 as Generalleutnant and commander of 7. Fallschirmjäger-Division

References

 
 

1898 births
1946 suicides
Military personnel from Königsberg
Luftwaffe World War II generals
German Army personnel of World War I
Prussian Army personnel
Fallschirmjäger of World War II
Recipients of the clasp to the Iron Cross, 1st class
Recipients of the Gold German Cross
Recipients of the Knight's Cross of the Iron Cross
German prisoners of war in World War II held by the United Kingdom
People who committed suicide in prison custody
German military personnel who committed suicide
Reichswehr personnel
Lieutenant generals of the Luftwaffe
20th-century Freikorps personnel
Suicides in Germany